Robert S. Rayburn (born August 8, 1950) is an American pastor and theologian. He is the pastor of Faith Presbyterian Church, a PCA church in Tacoma, Washington, and stated clerk of the Presbytery of the Pacific Northwest. Rayburn studied at Covenant College, Covenant Theological Seminary, and the University of Aberdeen.

Rayburn has been described as "the modern patriarch of covenant succession thinking," for his essay "The Presbyterian Doctrines of Covenant Children, Covenant Nurture and Covenant Succession". He was also the author of the PCA minority report in favor of paedocommunion.

He is the son of Robert G. Rayburn, the founder of Covenant College and Covenant Theological Seminary.

References

Living people
1950 births
Presbyterian Church in America ministers
Covenant Theological Seminary alumni
Alumni of the University of Aberdeen
American Calvinist and Reformed theologians